Ny Kongensgade 7 is a historic property in the small Frederiksholm Quarter of central Copenhagen, Denmark. It was listed on the Danish registry of protected buildings and places on 31 March 1931.

History
The house was built in 1769 for master stonemason Johan Friedrich Lohmann.  Born in Hannover, Lohmann had come to Denmark in c. 1760 where he initially worked for royal stone carver Jacob Fortling. He became licensed as a master stone carver in 1766. Lohman worked at the Royal Frederik Stone Quarry on Bornholm from 1779 but died the following year.

The writer Carl Brosbøll, better known under his pseudonym Carit Etlar, lived in the building as a student in 1848-49.

The property was home to 30 residents at the 1880 census. Ole Nielsen Kundby, an innkeeper, resided on the ground floor with his wife Stine Nielsen and two maids. Vilhelmine Hansen, who was the wife a consul (no mention of her husband in the census records), resided on the first floor with her 13-year-old son Charles Hansen. Andreas Jørgensen, a smith, resided on the second floor with his wife Maren Petersen, two more smiths and a woman lodger. Jens Hendriksen, a brewery worker, resided on the third floor with his wife Anna Christine Nielsen, their two children (aged four and nine) and two lodgers. 

Frederik Ludvig Henrik Christoff. Hagrese, a horse trainer and sergeant, resided on the first floor of the rear wing with Martine Kirstine Ursine Hagrese and their one-uear-old son, Peter Schønberg, a ship captain resided on the second floor of the rear wing with his wife Anna Conelia Schønberg f. Duniels and their five children(aged 10 tp 25). Peter Petersen, a coachman, resided on the third floor of the rear wing with his wife Anna Margrethe Petersen. Sophie Sommer, a widow seamstress, was also resident on the third floor of the rear wing.

Architecture
Ny Kongensgade consists of three floors over a cellar and is five bays wide. A side wing, probably from the 1770s, extends from the rear side of the building. A three-bay rear wing from 1813 was built for timber merchant Andreas Collstrup. The building was listed on the Danish registry of protected buildings and places on 31 March 1931.

Today
The building contains apartments on all floors.

References

External links

Listed residential buildings in Copenhagen
Houses completed in 1769